Niklas Bolten (born 29 March 1994) is a German footballer who plays as a goalkeeper.

References

External links
 

1994 births
Living people
Footballers from Düsseldorf
German footballers
Association football goalkeepers
Borussia Mönchengladbach II players
VfB Stuttgart II players
Regionalliga players
3. Liga players